Montemayor de Pililla is a municipality located in the province of Valladolid, Castile and León, Spain. According to the 2004 census (INE), the municipality has a population of 1,036 inhabitants.

Events 
From 14 to 18 September, the Exultation of the Holy Cross is held with traditional festivities such as bull fights, music and dancing.

There is also a feastday on 22 July, as it is the day of Montemayor de Pililla's patron saint, Mary Magdalene.

See also 
Cuisine of the province of Valladolid
Community website

Municipalities in the Province of Valladolid